Henry Prentiss (1801–1859) manufactured musical instruments, umbrellas and published sheet music, which he sold from his shop on Court Street in Boston, Massachusetts, in the 19th century.

One example of a piece of sheet music sold by Prentiss was a song named "Our Country" by Hon. George Lunt in 1847.

References

Further reading
 Mr. Henry Prentiss's Music Store (from the New York Mirror). Daily Atlas (Boston), 09-09-1841; p. 2.

External links

 WorldCat
 Library of Congress, Prints Dept. 
 https://www.flickr.com/photos/boston_public_library/2492714210/
 Metropolitan Museum of Art, Musical Instruments dept. Clarinet in E-flat from Prentiss' shop.
 American Antiquarian Society

1801 births
1859 deaths
Businesspeople from Boston
19th-century American businesspeople
19th century in Boston
Sheet music publishing companies